Beroun District is a district in the Central Bohemian Region of the Czech Republic. Its capital is the town of Beroun.

Administrative division
Beroun District is divided into two administrative districts of municipalities with extended competence: Beroun and Hořovice.

List of municipalities
Towns are marked in bold and market towns in italics:

Bavoryně -
Beroun - 
Běštín -
Březová -
Broumy -
Bubovice -
Bykoš -
Bzová -
Cerhovice - 
Chaloupky -
Chlustina -
Chodouň -
Chrustenice -
Chyňava -
Drozdov -
Felbabka -
Hlásná Třebaň -
Hořovice - 
Hostomice - 
Hředle -
Hudlice -
Hvozdec -
Hýskov -
Jivina -
Karlštejn - 
Komárov - 
Koněprusy -
Korno -
Kotopeky -
Králův Dvůr -
Kublov -
Lážovice -
Lhotka -
Libomyšl -
Liteň - 
Loděnice -
Lochovice -
Lužce -
Malá Víska -
Málkov -
Měňany -
Mezouň -
Mořina -
Mořinka -
Nenačovice -
Nesvačily -
Neumětely -
Nižbor -
Nový Jáchymov -
Olešná -
Osek -
Osov -
Otmíče -
Otročiněves -
Podbrdy -
Podluhy -
Praskolesy -
Rpety -
Skřipel -
Skuhrov -
Srbsko -
Stašov -
Suchomasty -
Svatá -
Svatý Jan pod Skalou -
Svinaře -
Tetín -
Tlustice -
Tmaň -
Točník -
Trubín -
Trubská -
Újezd -
Velký Chlumec -
Vinařice -
Vižina -
Vráž -
Všeradice -
Vysoký Újezd -
Zadní Třebaň -
Zaječov -
Záluží -
Zdice - 
Žebrák -
Železná

Geography

A hilly landscape is typical for the district. The territory extends into three geomorphological mesoregions: Křivoklát Highlands (north), Hořovice Uplands (central part) and Brdy Highlands (south).

The most important river is the Berounka, which drains the entire territory. Its longest tributary is the Litavka. The area is very poor in bodies of water.

There are three protected landscape areas: Bohemian Karst, Brdy and Křivoklátsko.

Demographics

Most populated municipalities

Economy
The largest employers with its headquarters in Beroun District and at least 500 employers are:

Transport
The D5 motorway from Prague to Plzeň and the border with Germany passes through the district.

Sights

The most important monuments in the district, protected as national cultural monuments, are:
Karlštejn Castle
Ruins of the castles Žebrák and Točník
Hořovice Castle
Benedictine monastery in Svatý Jan pod Skalou

The best-preserved settlements and landscapes, protected as monument zones, are:
Beroun
Kleštěnice
Korno
Mořinka
Olešná
Landscape around Osov

The most visited tourist destination is the Karlštejn Castle.

References

External links

Beroun District profile on the Czech Statistical Office's website

 
Districts of the Czech Republic